Hypsosinga albovittata is an orb-weaver spider species (family Araneidae), found in the Palearctic.

See also 
 List of Araneidae species: G-M

References

External links 

Araneidae
Spiders of Europe
Palearctic spiders
Spiders described in 1851